Vladimir Nikolayevich Gusev (born 4 July 1982) is a Russian former professional road racing cyclist, who rode professionally between 2004 and 2015 for the , , ,  and  teams.

Career
At the 2006 Paris–Roubaix, Gusev finished fourth but was later one of three riders disqualified by the race jury for illegally riding through a closed level-crossing.

On 25 July 2008, Gusev was fired by his  team for showing "abnormal" values during an internal doping check, a decision the Court of Arbitration for Sport found to be unjust in a ruling the following June.

Gusev joined  in 2010 after not riding for a trade team following his dismissal from Astana.

Major results

2000
 2nd  Time trial, UCI Junior Road World Championships
 2nd Overall Giro della Lunigiana
2001
 10th Time trial, UCI Under-23 Road World Championships
2002
 2nd Trofeo Alcide Degasperi
 5th Overall Giro Ciclistico d'Italia
2003
 1st  Time trial, National Road Championships
 1st Overall Grand Prix Guillaume Tell
1st Stages 3 & 4b (ITT)
 3rd  Time trial, UEC European Under-23 Road Championships
 3rd Gran Premio di Poggiana
 4th Overall Giro delle Regioni
1st Stage 1
 4th Trofeo Gianfranco Bianchin
 8th Gran Premio Palio del Recioto
2004
 2nd Chrono des Herbiers
 7th Cholet-Pays de Loire
 8th Gent–Wevelgem
 8th Paris–Bourges
2005
 National Road Championships
2nd Road race
2nd Time trial
 2nd Grand Prix d'Ouverture La Marseillaise
 3rd Chrono des Herbiers
 4th Paris–Camembert
 8th HEW Cyclassics
 9th Brabantse Pijl
 10th Tour of Flanders
2006
 1st  Overall Sachsen Tour International
 3rd Japan Cup
 4th Overall Deutschland Tour
1st  Young rider classification
1st Prologue
 4th Chrono des Nations
 8th Züri–Metzgete
 UCI Road World Championships
10th Time trial
10th Road race
2007
 1st  Time trial, National Road Championships
 1st  Overall Tour of Belgium
1st Stage 3 (ITT)
 Tour de Suisse
1st  Mountains classification
1st Stage 7
 Vuelta a Mallorca
2nd Trofeo Pollença
7th Trofeo Sóller
 5th Overall Three Days of De Panne
 5th Tour of Flanders
 5th Chrono des Nations
 5th Firenze–Pistoia
 6th Time trial, UCI Road World Championships
 6th Overall Eneco Tour
 Tour de France
Held  after Prologue–Stage 6
2008
 1st  Time trial, National Road Championships
 2nd Overall Tour of Austria
 8th Chrono des Nations
2010
 National Road Championships
1st  Time trial
2nd Road race
 6th Overall Tour of Austria
 10th Giro di Lombardia
2011
 3rd E3 Prijs Vlaanderen
 10th Overall Étoile de Bessèges
 10th Münsterland Giro
2012
 2nd Grand Prix of Aargau Canton
 3rd Overall Bayern–Rundfahrt
 7th Team time trial, UCI Road World Championships
2013
 National Road Championships
2nd Road race
2nd Time trial
2014
 2nd Road race, National Road Championships
2015
 2nd Overall Tour du Maroc
1st Stage 8
 5th Overall Tour de Ijen

Grand Tour general classification results timeline

References

External links

1982 births
Living people
Sportspeople from Nizhny Novgorod
Russian male cyclists
Tour de Suisse stage winners